Business Wars is a podcast hosted by David Brown and produced by Wondery. The podcast premiered on January 20 2018, and consists of more than 150 episodes. By the end of 2018, it has been downloaded more than 15 million times.

It critically examines "business rivalries" between two organizations (or between two brands) and tries to derive a conclusion concerning the success or failure in the form of a single episode or a series of episodes.

Seasons and episodes

Season 1 (2018)

Netflix vs Blockbuster LLC
Nike, Inc. vs Adidas
Marvel Comics vs DC Comics
IBM vs UNIVAC
Sony vs Nintendo
Hearst Communications vs Pulitzer
eBay vs PayPal
Coca-Cola vs Pepsi
Southwest Airlines vs American Airlines
Xbox vs PlayStation
Napster vs The Record Labels
Red Bull vs Monster Energy
 Browser Wars – Netscape vs Microsoft

Season 2 (2019)

McDonald's vs Burger King
United States Football League vs National Football League
Death Row Records vs Bad Boy Records
Hasbro vs Mattel
Ferrari vs Lamborghini
Netflix vs Blockbuster LLC Revisited
Anheuser-Busch vs Miller Brewing Company
Gibson vs Fender Musical Instruments Corporation
 Cereal Wars Kellogg’s vs. Post Consumer Brands vs. General Mills
Harley-Davidson and the Biker Wars
WWE vs World Championship Wrestling
Facebook vs Snapchat
Hershey vs Mars, Incorporated
 The Raisin Cartels
Macy's vs Gimbels
Ford Motor Company vs Chevrolet

Season 3 (2020)

 Boeing vs Airbus
 WeCrashed – The Rise and Fall of WeWork, a spin off
 Starbucks vs Dunkin' Donuts
 The North Face vs Patagonia, Inc.
 Amazon vs Walmart
 Uber vs Lyft
 Diamond Wars - De Beers
 Dating App Wars - Match.com vs. EHarmony vs.  Tinder (app) vs. Grindr vs. Bumble
 FedEx vs UPS
 Pizza Hut vs Domino's Pizza
 E & J Gallo Winery: The Godfather’s of Wine
 Levi's vs Lee (jeans)
 TikTok vs Instagram
 Encore: Hasbro vs Mattell

Season 4 (2021)

 SpaceX vs Blue Origin
 Estee Lauder Companies vs L'Oréal
 Late Night Wars - The Tonight Show vs. The Late Show (franchise)
 KFC vs Chick-fil-A
 Vaccine Wars - Moderna vs. BioNTech vs. Johnson & Johnson vs. AstraZeneca 
 Food Delivery Wars - Uber Eats vs. DoorDash vs. Grubhub vs. Postmates
 Bacardi vs. Pernod Ricard
 The Birth of Vegas
 Fast Fashion - TopShop vs. Zara (retailer) vs. H&M vs. Forever 21 vs. Shein (company)
 Crypto Wars
 BlackBerry vs. iPhone
 Christmas Movie Wars - The Hallmark Channel vs. Lifetime (TV network)

Season 5 (2022)

ESPN vs. Fox Sports
AirBNB vs. New York City
Tesla vs. Detroit
 Häagen-Dazs vs. Ben & Jerry’s
 Gucci vs. Louis Vuitton

Reception

Business Wars has been listed at number 4 in top 10 business podcast list by Inc. (magazine). Also, in the year 2018, it has been mentioned by Fortune (magazine) as one of the best business podcasts.

Awards

 Winner of 2019 Webby Award, Category – General Podcasts Business.
Winner of 2020 IHeartRadio Podcast Award – Best Business and Finance Podcast.

See also
 Masters of Scale
 Planet Money

References 

Investigative journalism
Infotainment
Audio podcasts
2018 podcast debuts
American podcasts